Syntormon is a genus of flies in the family Dolichopodidae. It includes about 110 species worldwide, more than 50 of which were described from the Palaearctic realm.

Species
The following species are included in the genus:

Subgenus Syntormon Loew, 1857:

Syntormon abbreviatus Becker, 1918
Syntormon affinis (Wheeler, 1899)
Syntormon ama Hollis, 1964
Syntormon aotearoa Bickel, 1999
Syntormon babu Hollis, 1964
Syntormon beijingensis Yang, 1998
Syntormon bicolorellus (Zetterstedt, 1843)
Syntormon bisinuatus Van Duzee, 1925
Syntormon boninensis Bickel, 1994
Syntormon brevicornis Frey, 1936
Syntormon bulgariensis Negrobov & Kechev, 2012
Syntormon caffer Curran, 1925
Syntormon californicus Harmston, 1951
Syntormon cilitarsis Becker, 1922
Syntormon cilitibia Stackelberg, 1947
Syntormon cinereiventris (Loew, 1861)
Syntormon clavatus Van Duzee, 1925
Syntormon codinai Parent, 1924
Syntormon curvisetus Negrobov, Kumazawa & Tago in Negrobov, Kumazawa, Tago & Selivanova, 2015
Syntormon cyanescens (Loew, 1858)
Syntormon denticulatus (Zetterstedt, 1843)
Syntormon detritus Becker, 1922
Syntormon dissimilipes Van Duzee, 1925
Syntormon dorsalis Vanschuytbroeck, 1951
Syntormon dukha Hollis, 1964
Syntormon edwardsi Van Duzee, 1930
Syntormon elongatus Becker, 1922
Syntormon emeiensis Yang & Saigusa, 1999
Syntormon eutarsiformis Negrobov, 1975
Syntormon femoratus Van Duzee, 1925
Syntormon filiger Verrall, 1912
Syntormon flavicoxus Negrobov, Kumazawa & Tago in Negrobov, Kumazawa, Tago & Selivanova, 2015
Syntormon flexibilis Becker, 1922
Syntormon francoisi Meuffels & Grootaert, 1999
Syntormon freymuthae Loew, 1873
Syntormon frivolus Becker, 1922
Syntormon fuscipes (von Roser, 1840)
Syntormon giordanii Negrobov, 1974
Syntormon grootaerti Maslova, Negrobov & Selivanova, 2017
Syntormon henanensis Yang & Saigusa, 2000
Syntormon iranicus Negrobov, 1974
Syntormon janelithae Bickel, 1999
Syntormon kennedyi Harmston & Knowlton, 1942
Syntormon latitarsis Negrobov & Shamshev, 1984
Syntormon longipes Parent, 1938
Syntormon longistylus Grichanov, 2001
Syntormon lucaris Bickel, 1999
Syntormon luchunensis Yang & Saigusa, 2001
Syntormon luishuiensis Yang & Saigusa, 2001
Syntormon luteicornis Parent, 1927
Syntormon macula Parent, 1927
Syntormon macula macula Parent, 1927
Syntormon macula mediterraneus Grichanov, 2013
Syntormon medogensis Wang, Yang & Masunaga, 2006
Syntormon metathesis (Loew, 1850)
Syntormon miki Strobl, 1899
Syntormon monile (Haliday, 1851)
Syntormon monochaetus Negrobov, 1975
Syntormon mutillatus Becker, 1918
Syntormon nubilus Van Duzee, 1933
Syntormon obscurior Parent, 1938
Syntormon opimus Vanschuytbroeck, 1951
Syntormon oregonensis Harmston & Knowlton, 1942
Syntormon ornatipes Van Duzee, 1925
Syntormon pallipes (Fabricius, 1794)
Syntormon palmaris (Loew, 1864)
Syntormon papei Grichanov, 2001
Syntormon papei madagascarensis Grichanov, 2001
Syntormon papei papei Grichanov, 2001
Syntormon parvus Vanschuytbroeck, 1951
Syntormon pennatus Ringdahl, 1920
Syntormon peregrinus Parent, 1954
Syntormon pilitibia Grichanov, 2013
Syntormon pseudopalmarae Negrobov & Shamshev, 1985
Syntormon pseudospicatus Strobl, 1899
Syntormon pumilus (Meigen, 1824)
Syntormon punctatus (Zetterstedt, 1843)
Syntormon qianus Wei & Yang, 2007
Syntormon quadratus Aldrich, 1901
Syntormon rhodani Vaillant, 1983
Syntormon rotundicornis Van Duzee, 1931
Syntormon samarkandi Negrobov, 1975
Syntormon setosus Parent, 1938
Syntormon simplicitarsis Van Duzee, 1925
Syntormon singaporensis Grootaert, Yang & Wang, 2006
Syntormon singularis Bickel, 1999
Syntormon siplivinskii Negrobov, 1975
Syntormon smirnovi Stackelberg, 1952
Syntormon straeleni Vanschuytbroeck, 1951
Syntormon strataegus (Wheeler, 1899)
Syntormon subinermis (Loew, 1869)
Syntormon subinermis asiaticus Negrobov, 1975
Syntormon subinermis subinermis (Loew, 1869)
Syntormon submonilis Negrobov, 1975
Syntormon sulcipes (Meigen, 1824)
Syntormon tabarkae Becker, 1918
Syntormon tamatave Grichanov, 2001
Syntormon tarsatus (Fallén, 1823)
Syntormon tasmanensis Bickel, 1999
Syntormon triangulipes Becker, 1902
Syntormon tricoloripes Curran, 1923
Syntormon trisetus Yang, 1998
Syntormon uintaensis Harmston & Knowlton, 1940
Syntormon utahensis Harmston & Knowlton, 1942
Syntormon valae Negrobov & Zhilina, 1986
Syntormon vanduzeei Curran, 1931
Syntormon variegatus Harmston, 1952
Syntormon violovitshi Negrobov, 1975
Syntormon wittei Vanschuytbroeck, 1951
Syntormon xinjiangensis Yang, 1999
Syntormon xiphandroides Parent, 1932
Syntormon xishuiensis Wang, Yang & Grootaert, 2008
Syntormon xizangensis Yang, 1999
Syntormon zelleri (Loew, 1850
Syntormon zhengi Yang, 1998

Subgenus Drymonoeca Becker, 1907:
Syntormon aulicus (Meigen, 1824)

Unrecognised species:
Syntormon decoratus (Haliday, 1832)

Synonyms:
Syntormon dobrogicus Pârvu, 1985: synonym of Syntormon metathesis (Loew, 1850)
Syntormon praeteritus (Parent, 1929): moved to Sympycnus
Syntormon silvianus Pârvu, 1989: synonym of Syntormon submonilis Negrobov, 1975

Syntormon guizhouensis Wang & Yang, 2006 is an unavailable name, as it does not satisfy ICZN Articles 16.1 and 16.4: the original publication does not explicitly indicate the name to be intentionally new, and the fixation of name-bearing types for the species is not explicit.

Notes

References

Dolichopodidae genera
Sympycninae
Taxa named by Hermann Loew